Stegotetrabelodon is an extinct genus of primitive elephantid with gomphothere-like anatomical features from the Late Miocene to Early Pliocene of Africa and Eurasia and the Arabian peninsula. The other unequivocally recognized species is S. orbus, also of late Miocene Africa. Other species outside of Africa are questionably placed in this genus, including teeth from Late Miocene Hungary and Iran originally described as being of the Mastodon subgenus Bunolophodon, Chinese specimens originally described as being also of Mastodon, as well as of Tetralophodon and Stegodon, and a species from the late Miocene-aged Dhok Pathan Formation in Pakistan, S. maluvalensis.

Arabian Peninsula
In December 2006, a small contingent of Emirates Natural History Group members found several sets of proboscidean footprints thought to belong to Stegotetrabelodon preserved in a large calcareous exposure between the sand dunes of "Mleisa 1" in the Western Region of the Emirate of Abu Dhabi, the United Arab Emirates.

References

 
 

Prehistoric elephants
Miocene proboscideans
Gomphotheres
Prehistoric placental genera
Miocene mammals of Africa
Prehistoric mammals of Europe
Miocene mammals of Asia
Fossil taxa described in 1941